"The Wreck of the Number Nine" is an American train song, part of a subgenre about train wrecks.

It was written by Carson Robison in 1927.

Possibly the best-known version is by Jim Reeves, although it has been sung by several other singers.

It tells the story of a brave engineer who takes his train out on a stormy night after kissing his sweetheart goodbye, promising to marry her the next day, but he is killed in a head-on collision with another train.  Unlike some other songs in the "train wreck" subgenre, it is not based on a real incident, and it does have a known author.

1927 songs
Jim Reeves songs
Songs about trains
Train wreck ballads
Songs written by Carson Robison